Alessandra Locatelli (born 24 September 1976) is an Italian politician. A member of the League, she is serving as Minister for Disabilities in the Meloni Cabinet since 2022.

Biography
Alessandra Locatelli graduated in sociology at the University of Milano-Bicocca. She is an educator specializing in the care of people with mental disabilities. In March 2016 she became city secretary of the Northern League in Como. In the 2017 local elections, she was elected to the Como City Council and then appointed Deputy Mayor and Assessor by Mayor Mario Landriscina.

In 2018 she was elected to the Chamber of Deputies in the Lombardy 2 constituency. On 10 July 2019 she was designated as the new Minister for the family and disabilities of the Conte Government, to replace Lorenzo Fontana, and swore the same day.

References

1976 births
21st-century Italian women politicians
Conte I Cabinet
Lega Nord politicians
Deputies of Legislature XVIII of Italy
Living people
People from Como
Women government ministers of Italy
21st-century Italian educators
Meloni Cabinet
Government ministers of Italy
Women members of the Chamber of Deputies (Italy)